Teachers and Teaching: Theory and Practice is a peer-reviewed academic journal that publishes research on teaching. It was established in 1995 and is published eight times per year by Taylor & Francis. The editor-in-chief is Christopher Day (University of Nottingham). According to the Journal Citation Reports, the journal has a 2017 impact factor of 2.378, ranking it 36th out of 238 journals in the category "Education & Educational Research".

References

External links

Education journals
Publications established in 1995
Taylor & Francis academic journals
English-language journals
8 times per year journals